Lily Pereg (1964–2019) was an Australian microbiologist who was born in Israel and studied at university in Tel Aviv. She moved to Australia in the 1990s to undertake a PhD at the University of Sydney, which she completed in 1998. In 2001 Pereg took up an appointment at the University of New England, where she was promoted to Professor of Microbiology in 2018.

Pereg's research focused on soil microbial ecology and plant-microbial interactions. She taught microbiology, biochemistry and biotechnology at the University of New England. She was elected as President of the European Geosciences Union Soil Systems Science Division, a position she was due to take up in April 2019.

Pereg and her sister were found dead in Mendoza, Argentina, in January 2019. Pereg's nephew was arrested on homicide charges.

References 

1964 births
2019 deaths
Australian women scientists
Australian microbiologists
University of Sydney alumni
Academic staff of the University of New England (Australia)
Israeli emigrants to Australia